Sebastián Mauricio Fernández Presa (born 15 November 1989) is a Uruguayan footballer who plays as a forward or attacking midfielder for San Lorenzo.

Club career
Fernández started his professional career playing for Miramar Misiones in 2008. In his four years at the club, the striker scored 27 goals in 66 league appearances. In February 2012, he was transferred to Uruguayan giants Danubio F.C. playing 6 months in the Uruguayan Primera División. In the top division, he scored 4 goals in 14 matches. On 8 June 2012, he signed with Liga MX side San Luis F.C. On 28 December 2012, he was transferred to Peruvian club Universitario de Deportes. While with Universitario, Fernández helped the club capture the 2013 Peruvian First Division title. In 26 appearances with the club he scored 5 goals.

On 5 February 2014, Fernández was acquired on loan by Vancouver Whitecaps FC of the Major League Soccer. In his debut match, the Whitecaps' season opener on 8 March 2014, he made the club's starting 11 and scored the team's second goal against New York Red Bulls, winning Man of the Match honours.

Fernández signed with San Lorenzo for the 2019 season.

Honours

Club
Universitario de Deportes 
 Torneo Descentralizado (1): 2013

References

External links

1989 births
Living people
Uruguayan footballers
Uruguayan expatriate footballers
Association football forwards
Miramar Misiones players
Danubio F.C. players
San Luis F.C. players
Club Universitario de Deportes footballers
Boston River players
Vancouver Whitecaps FC players
Paraguayan Primera División players
Uruguayan Primera División players
Liga MX players
Peruvian Primera División players
Major League Soccer players
Expatriate footballers in Mexico
Expatriate footballers in Peru
Expatriate soccer players in Canada